Smoking in Canada is banned in indoor  public spaces, public transit facilities and workplaces (including restaurants, bars, and casinos), by all territories and provinces, and by the federal government. As of 2010, legislation banning smoking within each of these jurisdictions is mostly consistent, despite the separate development of legislation by each jurisdiction. Notable variations between the jurisdictions include: whether, and in what circumstances ventilated smoking rooms are permitted; whether, and up to what distance away from a building is smoking banned outside of a building; and, whether smoking is banned in private vehicles occupied by children.

Some municipalities have bylaws restricting smoking further than the applicable national/provincial/territorial legislation. There have also been significant changes to public smoking regulations across the country following the legalization of recreational cannabis on October 17, 2018. This has resulted in additional regulations pertaining to the public consumption of cannabis in each province, with varying similarity to regulations concerning tobacco consumption.

The federal government's smoking ban in workplaces and on common carriers applies only to the federal government and to federally regulated businesses, such as airports. Smoking rooms are not permitted.
As of 2020, 12.9% of Canadians aged 15 and older smoke.

Overview by jurisdiction

Alberta
Alberta banned smoking in public spaces and workplaces, including within 5 metres of doors, windows, and outdoor air intakes, on 1 January 2008. A tobacco display ban (or "powerwall") law requiring shop-owners to keep tobacco sales out of sight was  implemented 1 July 2008. As of 1 January 2009, cigarette sales in Alberta have been banned in all stores containing a pharmacy, at post-secondary educational institutions, and in healthcare facilities. It is illegal to sell to minors, and it is an offence for a minor to possess or consume tobacco in a public place, punishable by a fine up to $100. Retailers who sell tobacco products to minors are subject to a fine of up to $10,000 for a first offence, and up $100,000 for second or subsequent offences. As of November 14, 2014, it has been illegal to smoke in a vehicle with children under the age of 16. No one under the age of 18 is permitted to buy tobacco or vaping products.

On June 23, 2021, Alberta's cabinet amended the regulations enabled by the province's Tobacco, Smoking and Vaping Reduction Act, 2005 to allow for ventilated smoking rooms for the smoking of cigars. Such rooms are permitted so long as they meet the following conditions: 

"...(a) the cigar lounge is designated as a cigar lounge by the manager; 

(b) the cigar lounge has floor-to-ceiling walls, a ceiling and doors that separate the lounge visually and physically from any adjacent area in which smoking is prohibited under the Act;

(c) the cigar lounge has doors equipped with a properly functioning self‑closing device;

(d) the cigar lounge is equipped with a separate ventilation system that maintains negative air pressure at all times and exhausts smoke directly to the outside of the building in which the lounge is located;

(e) minors have no access to the cigar lounge;

(f) no service, including cleaning, is allowed in the cigar lounge during the hours of operation."

As of 2021, Alberta and Quebec are the only two provinces or territories which permit cigar lounges or any ventilated smoking rooms outside of nursing homes and long-term care facilities. Alberta is unique in being the sole province or territory which does not restrict the establishment of new lounges; Quebec's remaining lounges are preserved through a grandfather clause in its smoking statutes.

As of 2015, 15.8% of Alberta residents smoke.

British Columbia
British Columbia banned smoking in all public spaces and workplaces including, as of March 2008, within a 6-metre radius of doors, open windows and air intakes.  Additionally, all commercial displays of tobacco visible to people under the age of 19 was banned in public areas under the same legislation.  As of March 2008, ventilated smoking rooms are only permitted in nursing homes and care facilities. Smoking in a motor vehicle when a passenger is 16 years or under, regardless of the use of windows or sunroofs to vent smoke, is prohibited by section 231.1 of the Motor Vehicle Act. The smoking ban does not apply to hotel rooms, though many have private bans on the practice. 

As of 2015, 10.2% of British Columbia residents smoke, the lowest of any province.

Manitoba
Manitoba banned smoking in all workplaces and enclosed public spaces on October 1, 2004. Specially ventilated rooms are not allowed in bars and restaurants. A law banning retail displays of tobacco and heavily restricting promotion and advertising of tobacco and tobacco-related products came into effect on 15 October 2005. An act banning smoking in vehicles when children under 16 are present became law July 15, 2010, and applies to all lighted tobacco products.

As of 2015, 14.8% of Manitoba residents smoke.

New Brunswick
New Brunswick banned smoking in public spaces and workplaces in October 2004. Ventilated smoking rooms are not permitted. Since January 1, 2009 tobacco products cannot be displayed prominently in stores. Since January 1, 2010, the ban has been expanded to include vehicles with children under 16 present. The legal age to purchase tobacco is 19.

As of 2015, 14.2% of New Brunswick residents smoke.

Newfoundland and Labrador
Newfoundland and Labrador banned smoking within public places such as day cares, schools, taxis, hospitals, retail stores, and recreational facilities in 1994. From 1994 to 2002 public places, such as food establishments, bars and bingo halls, and workplaces could allow smoking in designated smoking areas or rooms. In 2002, through an amendment to the Smoke-free Environment Act, smoking was banned in food establishments, shopping malls, transportation terminals, hotel/motel common areas, games arcades, public libraries and boys and girls clubs. In 2005, smoking was banned in all public spaces and workplaces, under the province's Smoke-Free Environment Act, including licensed liquor establishments and bingo halls. Enclosed, ventilated smoking rooms are permitted only in psychiatric facilities and long term care facilities. Sales of tobacco are prohibited in places such as in retail stores that have a pharmacy, on university and college campuses, or recreational facilities. Smoking in a motor vehicle, when a person under the age of 16 is present, became illegal in 2011.

As of 2015, 18.5% of Newfoundland and Labrador residents smoke.

Nova Scotia
Nova Scotia banned smoking in public spaces and workplaces on December 1, 2006.  Ventilated smoking rooms are permitted in nursing homes and care facilities. Tobacco products cannot be displayed prominently in stores.  On April 1, 2008, smoking in a car with passengers under 19 inside became illegal. Minors are prohibited from possessing tobacco products. 

As of 2015, 17.8% of Nova Scotia residents smoke.

Ontario
Ontario banned smoking in public spaces and workplaces in 1994 with the passing of the Tobacco Control Act and became the first province to outlaw the sale of tobacco in pharmacies. This was replaced with the Smoke Free Ontario Act in May 2006. In 2008, a ban on retail displays of tobacco was implemented. Since January 21, 2009, smoking is banned in all vehicles if anyone under the age of 16 is present. As of January 1, 2015, smoking is prohibited province-wide on all bar and restaurant patios and within a 20-meter radius of all playgrounds and sports fields. Tobacco sales are prohibited on college and university campuses. As of January 1, 2018, hospital properties must be 100% smoke-free.

Many Ontario municipalities (cities, counties and regions) have passed smoke-free bylaws that are stricter than the provincial Smoke Free Ontario Act, such as City of Toronto, City of Ottawa, Region of Niagara, Region of Peel, City of Hamilton, and City of Barrie.

For example, as of April 2, 2012, in Ottawa, smoke free regulations prohibit smoking on all municipal properties, including parks, playgrounds, beaches, sports fields, fruit and vegetable markets and outdoor areas around City facilities. Outdoor restaurant and bar patios and terraces are also smoke free. Smoking has also been prohibited on all public transit (OC Transpo) properties including station platforms, since 2007. Fines for non-compliance range from $305 to $5000 as per the Provincial Offences Act.

Hamilton banned smoking on all municipal properties, including parks, playgrounds, beaches, sports fields on May 31, 2012.  Any person who contravenes a provision of this by-law is guilty of an offence and upon conviction is liable to a maximum fine of $10,000.00.

In Toronto, Municipal Code prohibits smoking within 9 meters of an entrance or exit of any building used by the public. Smoking is also prohibited in all public squares and within 9 meters of park amenities such as playgrounds, sports fields, skate parks, ski hills, picnic areas, swimming pools, theatre space, splash pads, washrooms, beaches, park zoos and farms, and service waiting lines. In April 2019, a proposal brought forward by Councillor Ana Bailão and seconded by Councillor Mike Layton, called for a response to the issue of cigarette butt litter in front of businesses including bars, restaurants, and other establishments. The motion requests a review of the issue of cigarette butt litter, with consideration by the end of the fourth quarter of 2019 about introducing new regulations. Ones that would require business owners and operators to ensure that such litter is removed from in front of their premises as a condition of the issuance of a business licence.

In Ontario, where more than one regulation, act or bylaw exists, the one that is the most restrictive of smoking prevails.

As of 2015, 11.3% of Ontario residents smoke.

Prince Edward Island
Prince Edward Island banned smoking in public spaces and workplaces in 2003. Ventilated smoking rooms are only allowed in long-term care facilities.

As of 2015, 12.9% of Prince Edward Island residents smoke.

Québec
Quebec banned smoking in public spaces and workplaces, such as offices, hospitals, restaurants and bars on 31 May 2006. Smoking is banned within a 9m radius of the entrances of social services institutions such as hospitals, community centres, CEGEP, colleges and universities. Smoking is banned on the properties of elementary and high schools. The province eliminated designated smoking rooms in 2008. The law was amended by Bill 44 in November 2015. The sale of electronic cigarettes is regulated like tobacco, including restrictions on advertising. ID requirements for tobacco sales are stricter and fines are increased. It is prohibited to sell flavoured tobacco products, including menthol. All public organizations, such as hospitals and post-secondary education institutions, must adopt a smoke-free and smoking cessation policy and report to the government. Since May 26, 2016, smoking and e-cigarettes are banned on restaurant and bar patios and terraces, playgrounds and sports fields, including a  radius. Smoking in a vehicle with children under 16 is also prohibited. As of November 2016, smoking was banned within a  radius of all doors, windows and air intakes of any building open to the public. Standardized warning label sizes was applied to all tobacco packages.

As of 2021, Quebec and Alberta are the only two provinces or territories which permit cigar lounges or any ventilated smoking rooms outside of nursing homes and long-term care facilities. Alberta is unique in being the sole province or territory which does not restrict the establishment of new lounges; Quebec's remaining lounges are preserved through a grandfather clause in its smoking statutes. In Montreal, all cigar bars opened before May 10, 2005 were allowed to stay in operation, though future establishments were banned. There are also cigar lounges in Gatineau.

Contrary to stereotypes and popular portrayal, Quebec’s smoking rate is around the Canadian average, and is lower than that of the U.S. and far lower than the smoking rate of France.  As of 2015, 14.2% of Quebec residents smoke.

Saskatchewan
Saskatchewan banned smoking in public places on January 1, 2005, and banned smoking in workplaces on May 31, 2009. The province reinstated tobacco display ban (2005) requires shop owners to keep tobacco sales out of sight. There are fines of up to $10 000 for violation of the Tobacco Control Act which bans smoking in all public areas, indoor and outdoor, including clubs for veterans. Since October 1, 2010, smoking is prohibited if there are children under 16 years of age in the vehicle.

As of 2015, 16.9% of Saskatchewan residents smoke.

Northwest Territories
The Northwest Territories banned smoking in public places and workplaces on 1 May 2004.

Nunavut
Nunavut banned smoking in public spaces and workplaces, including within three metres of entrances and exits to those buildings on May 1, 2004. 

As of 2014, 62% of Nunavut residents smoke, the highest of any territory.

Yukon

The Yukon banned smoking in public spaces and workplaces on 15 May 2008 after passing an anti-smoking bill in 2007. It was the last of the provinces and territories to implement a ban.

Smoking cessation programs

There are numerous public and private smoking cessation programs in Canada. The Government of Canada legislated the mandatory display of warning messages on all cigarette packaging, including images depicting the long-term consequences of smoking, and has also banned tobacco advertising. A loophole which allowed the display of a sponsor's logo at cultural events (for example, the Symphony of Fire fireworks display, once known as the Benson & Hedges Symphony of Fire) was closed in the late 1990s.  The Government of Ontario sponsors a program named Stupid, with an accompanying website stupid.ca, that seeks to educate adolescents about the danger of smoking.  The blue ribbon campaign was started in 1999 by the students at Hugh Boyd Secondary School in British Columbia and has gone national now.

See also
Tobacco-Free Pharmacies in Canada

References

 
Health in Canada